Here are the winners and nominees of the Black Reel Award for Best Original or Adapted Song. The award goes to the artist and the writers of the song.

Most Wins:
 John Legend – 3 wins

Most Nominations:
 Beyoncé, John Legend – 4 nominations
 Henry Krieger, Ludacris, Alicia Keys – 3 nominations
 Eminem, Joe Budden, Mary J. Blige, Jennifer Hudson, Randy Newman, Ne-Yo, Terry Lewis, Jimmy Jam, Snoop Dogg, Anika Noni Rose, R. Kelly, Raphael Saadiq, Luis Restro, Jay Z, Kanye West, Pharrell Williams, Common, Ludwig Gorannson – 2 nominations

Winners and nominees

References

Black Reel Awards
Film awards for Best Song